An international diplomatic crisis between Georgia and Russia began in 2008, when Russia announced that it would no longer participate in the Commonwealth of Independent States economic sanctions imposed on Abkhazia in 1996 and established direct relations with the separatist authorities in Abkhazia and South Ossetia. The crisis was linked to the push for Georgia to receive a NATO Membership Action Plan and, indirectly, the unilateral declaration of independence by Kosovo.

Increasing tensions led to the outbreak of the Russo-Georgian War in 2008. After the war, a number of incidents occurred in both conflict zones, and tensions between the belligerents remained high.

Prelude to war

Lifting of CIS sanctions
During a meeting with the presidents of Abkhazia and South Ossetia in February 2008, the Russian official declared Moscow should "reshape its relations with self-proclaimed republics". Russia's Duma called a session for 13 March to discuss the issue of recognition of the unrecognized republics in the former Soviet Union.

On 6 March 2008, Russia lifted Commonwealth of Independent States (CIS) sanctions imposed on Abkhazia in 1996, and declared them outdated. The Russian decision was met with protests from Tbilisi and lack of support from the other CIS countries. Shalva Natelashvili, leader of the Georgian Labour Party, warned Russia's lifting of economic sanctions on Abkhazia meant Georgia would lose Abkhazia.

Increased involvement of Russia with breakaway republics in Georgia
On 1 March 2008, Russian General Vasily Lunev, former Deputy Commander of Siberian Military District was appointed as defence minister of South Ossetia.

Abkhazia and South Ossetia both submitted formal requests for recognition of their independence to Russia, and international community, citing the precedent of the recognition of Kosovo. European Commissioner for External Relations Benita Ferrero-Waldner said that there was "a growing preoccupation and anxiety that Russia may be paving the way for recognition of Abkhazia," and stated the EU's support for Georgia's territorial integrity.

Russia's ambassador to NATO warned that a move by Georgia to join NATO could bolster the recognition of the independence of Abkhazia and South Ossetia, arguing that since the NATO referendum held in Georgia did not include the breakaway states, it showed Georgia intended to join NATO without them.

The Duma Committee for CIS on 13 March, following a hearing on the unrecognized republics, recommended a deepening of links with Abkhazia, South Ossetia and Transnistria. Other recommendations included the establishment of diplomatic missions in the regions (with the foreign ministry to decide whether they would be consulates or another type of mission), a removal of import duties on goods created by businesses with Russian shareholders in the regions, and increased humanitarian and economic assistance for Russian passport holders in the regions. The Nezavisimaya Gazeta daily described the hearing as "the launch of a procedure of recognition."

On 21 March 2008, Russian State Duma adopted a resolution, in which it called on Russian president and the government to consider the recognition of Abkhazia and South Ossetia.

This decision was linked to the push for Georgia to receive a NATO Membership Action Plan and, indirectly, the unilateral declaration of independence by Kosovo. Anonymous Russian diplomat had told Nezavisimaya Gazeta that the draft decree was aimed at de facto annexation rather than recognition.

Direct dealings between Russia and Abkhazia on the transfer of Russian citizens from Abkhaz prisons raised concern from Secretary General of the Council of Europe Terry Davis since the dealings were done without seeking the permission of the Georgian government.

Russia's state-owned Gazprom was reported to be planning oil and gas exploration in Abkhazia beginning 1 July 2008. In addition, Abkhazia said international airline flights from Russia could use Sukhumi airport through the International Civil Aviation Organization had said such flights would be unacceptable. Officials from Gazprom said there were no plans for oil exploration in Abkhazia, but did say there was a proposal being considered to build a gas pipeline to Abkhazia. Responding to Russian media reports that sea links between Sochi in Russia and Gagra in Abkhazia would be resumed, Georgia threatened to appeal to international marine organizations over the use of "illegal" routes.

Post-War

Separation 
Between 1918 and 1921, Georgia was briefly independent from the Russian empire. After a couple of years, Georgia and another former Russian state became Soviet Socialist Republics. During the transition to the Soviet Socialist Republic, in 1922 South Ossetia was created within the new Georgian republic than a few years later in 1931 the Abkhazia republic was downgraded to being an Oblast republic in Georgia. A year later in 1990, South Ossetia declared independence from Georgia. A year later Georgia declared independence from the Soviet Union which leads to future Georgian conflicts.

From 1991–1992, there were armed conflicts between Georgia, Abkhazia, and South Ossetia; during this conflict, Zviad Gamsakhurdia was disposed of as the president. After 1992, the two territories tried to claim independence but it always resulted in an armed conflict with Georgia. Up until the Abkhazian separatist forces defeated the Georgian military in 1993; after that in October 1993 Georgia joins the Commonwealth of Independent States. After a couple of years of fighting, a cease-fire was declared and signed in 1994 between the Georgian forces and the Abkhazia separatists; during the ceasefire Russian Peace troops were dispatched in the conflicted area.

Russian peacekeepers 
After the armed conflict between Georgia and the South Ossetia region, both sides agreed and signed the involvement of Russia and Russia peacekeepers. As of 2022, Russia maintains that its peacekeepers were the victims of Georgian state aggression in 2008.

Russian tactics 
As the conflict between Georgia and Russia raged on in August 2008, Georgian forces began to realize that it was not a coincidence and that the Russian forces seemed prepared to fight.  When Russian forces began to move south into Georgia, they would pick advantageous points and use aircraft to knock out television towers. Russia began to build illegal fences around the South Ossetia territory. Russia's actions included "constructing illegal fencing and earthen barriers to separate communities and further divide the Georgian population” The West and Georgia feared Russia was trying to slowly annex Georgia and divide the country. Over time, Russia installed 19 military bases in South Ossetia which made the West very concerned for the future of Georgia and the region.

Russia-Georgia relations in 2013 
Five years after the 2008 Russia Georgia conflict, the Georgian government showed support for restoring relations with Russia. Russia continued to maintain a military presence, "Russian troops [were] stationed in 20% of the country's territory." Russia was in talks about lifting sanctions off of Georgia and relaxing travel restrictions; Georgia wanted to continue its path toward membership in the European Union and NATO. During the conflict, many Georgians were asked what their views were on Russia. Many claimed to love the people of Russia, but one interviewee claimed to only dislike Vladimir Putin. The relationship between Russia and Georgia was improving very slowly as both sides talked about the future of the relationship between the two and the future of Georgia.

Impact on Georgia and South Ossetia 
The Russia-Georgian conflict came to an end with a ceasefire that was implemented 12 August 2008. Georgia ended with conflict without the South Ossetia territory, which Russia recognized their independence, but Georgia still viewed it as part of its own territory. Ossetia's split from Georgia caused its domestic economy to collapse. After the conflict, South Ossetia "totally rely on funding from Russia, but because of corruption". This pushed Georgia to sign an association agreement with the European Union, but they had yet to submit for membership.

War crimes 
At the end of the conflict between Russia and Georgia, Georgia went to the European court of human rights to provide evidence that Russia committed war crimes during the conflict. These Russian bombing lead to many Georgians losing their homes and being killed. Communities and villages were destroyed, and many Georgians were forced by Russian troops to leave their homes. Georgia also claimed that when the conflict first broke out in 2008, Russia had approximately 30,000 troops that were distributed in South Ossetia and Abkhazia provinces. The verdict for the case is supposed to be given and it may find Russia guilty for some of these cries, but the Kremlin threatens to hold funding from the court and to withdraw from the court entirely.

Weapons of war 
Given the history and connection of Russia and Georgia, they both used different types of weapons during the conflict. By Georgia is a former state of the Soviet Union, it was expected for them to use Soviet-era weaponry. Many of the Russian weapons were Soviet era and many soldiers had a hard time using them during the conflict. It was "estimated that some 80 percent of Russian weaponry had not been refurbished since the collapse of the Soviet Union in 1991” The Soviet-era weapons set Russia back a little during the conflict while Georgia was using more efficient and updated weaponry. Before the conflict, Georgia had many of its tanks and infantry vehicles updated by western firms. Reports also claimed, "Georgian aircraft tended to have superior communication, avionics, and weapon-control system” compared to the Russian aircraft. Russian soldiers at one point during the conflict had to strip dead Georgian soldiers of their armor to increase their protection. Most of the Russian's military equipment was ineffective against the Georgian forces.

Georgia drone-downing incidents 

On 20 April 2008 a Georgian unarmed unmanned aerial vehicle (UAV) was shot down over the Abkhaz conflict zone. Russia's Air Force denied Georgian claims that a MiG-29 Fulcrum fighter, from the Gudauta military base, was involved in the incident. Abkhazia's separatist administration said earlier that they had shot down the drone at 6 a.m. GMT, but Georgians denied this. Abkhazia said that they were defending their airspace.

Furthermore, Russian Ministry of Foreign Affairs issued a statement accusing Georgia of violating the 1994 Moscow agreement and United Nations resolutions on Abkhazia by deploying without authorisation a UAV which also can be used for adjusting of fire.

On 23 April 2008, a closed meeting of the UN Security Council was held in New York.

Early in May 2008, both Russian and Abkhaz sides claimed that two more Georgian reconnaissance drones were shot over Abkhazia. Georgia denied these allegations, stating that it was "a provocation" aimed at "information-propagandistic support of Russia's military intervention."

On 26 May 2008, the U.N. mission released the conclusion of its independent investigation into the 20 April incident. It confirmed that the Georgian video footage and radar data were authentic and the jet which destroyed the drone was indeed Russian. The conclusion report said that the jet flew towards the Russian territory after the incident, but it was unclear where the attacker took off, naming the Gudauta base as a possible locality. Georgia hailed the report, but Russia dismissed it.

According to Der Spiegel, after the incident President Saakashvili deployed 12,000 Georgian troops to Senaki in May 2008. Georgia had officially suspended drone flights over Abkhazia in early June, but Abkhazia accused Georgia of continuing to fly drones in the region.

Military buildup in Abkhazia 

In late April 2008, Russia said that Georgia was amassing 1,500 soldiers and police in the upper Kodori Gorge area and planning to invade Abkhazia. President Saakashvili, in his televised address, pledged to pursue only a peaceful line in the conflict areas and called upon the Abkhaz and Ossetians to unite with Georgia in defying attempts by "outrageous and irresponsible" external force to trigger bloodshed. Russia accused Georgia of trying to solve the Abkhazia problem by force and of sending its troops in the Georgian-controlled upper Kodori Valley in Abkhazia. Russia announced it would increase its military in the region and threatened to "retaliate" militarily to Georgia's efforts. The Georgian Prime Minister Lado Gurgenidze said Georgia would treat any additional troops in Abkhazia as aggressors. The United States called on Russia "to reconsider" "some provocative steps" it had taken in respect of Abkhazia.

Georgia suspended Russia's admission to the World Trade Organization (WTO). Russian Cossacks and North Caucasian volunteers declared their readiness to fight Georgia in the case of a renewed confrontation in Abkhazia. On 6 May 2008, the Georgian state minister for reintegration Temur Iakobashvili said Georgia was on the verge of war with Russia.

According to the statement of the Russian Ministry of Defense issued on 8 May, it had increased the number of its peacekeepers in Abkhazia to 2,542 peacekeepers, which was 458 short of the 3,000 limit set by agreement. Georgia showed video footage to the BBC allegedly proving that Russian troops used military hardware in Abkhazia and were a fighting force, rather than peacekeepers; Russia denied the accusations.

Sergei Bagapsh, Abkhazia's separatist president, said he was in favor of Russia establishing a military base in Abkhazia and called for the signing of a military cooperation agreement with Russia modeled on the Taiwan Relations Act. Alexander Zelin, commander of the Russian Air Forces said if such a decision was made it would "promote the implementation of air defense tasks" and noted Russia had similar cooperation with Armenia. On 16 May 2008, Yuri Baluevsky, chief of general staff of the Russian Armed Forces denied Russia had any plans to build a military base in Abkhazia.

On 18 May 2008, Georgia detained five Russian peacekeepers along the administrative border with the Abkhazia region saying that their armoured personnel carrier collided with a Georgian woman's car, in the town of Zugdidi. The peacekeepers were later released. Alexander Diordiev, a Russian peacekeeping official, confirmed the detention of the Russian soldiers but said there was no collision and instead that Georgians provoked the peacekeepers in an attempt to discredit the Russians. According to Diordiev, peacekeepers were redeploying hardware near the village of Urta on the night of 17–18 May when Georgian law-enforcement officers blocked the road to the peacekeepers' armored personnel carrier and fuel tanker truck. Then a damaged Volga car approached the scene and the Georgian police claimed that the car had been damaged by the Russian peacekeepers. Diordiev said that force was used against the peacekeepers. A statement by the Russian Foreign Ministry issued on 19 May 2008 compared the Georgians' actions to those of "true street bandits" saying the Georgians used "crude physical force," striking one peacekeeper in the head and taking two to the police station. According to the statement, only after the intervention of the Collective Forces for the Support of Peace command and the UN observation mission, were the Russian peacekeepers released. Diordiev stated that the Georgians were informed in advance that the equipment would be moved.

On 19 May 2008, Nezavisimaya Gazeta reported that over the weekend Moscow's military leadership authorized peacekeepers to conduct armed operations on their own behalf if necessary. Sergei Shamba, the Abkhaz foreign minister, said the report was "credible."

On 21 May 2008 heavy gunfire was reported near the Abkhaz administrative border. A Georgian interior ministry official said two buses of passengers going to vote in the Georgian elections were fired upon. Some reports said the bridge, connecting Abkhazia and Georgian region of Mingrelia, was blocked by Abkhaz separatists during the elections in Georgia. Georgian officials accused Abkhazia of the attacks and preventing Georgians from voting in the legislative elections. Abkhaz president Sergei Bagapsh denied these allegations, instead saying that the attack occurred on the Georgian territory and Georgians living in Abkhazia were not interested in voting. Abkhazia said Russian peacekeepers were sent to the border to prevent further violence.

Georgia's Foreign Ministry sent a protest note to the CIS secretariat demanding illegal Russian troops and armaments to be immediately withdrawn from Abkhazia, saying that according to the UN, an airborne battalion, 50 BMD-2 airborne combat vehicles, and two artillery batteries had been deployed in Abkhazia. The ministry said this deployment contradicted a 1995 resolution of the CIS presidents' council.

On 15 June 2008, media reports said that Russia had set up a military base near the village of Agubedia in Abkhazia's Ochamchira District and had deployed heavy armor there. Russia's Defense Ministry denied the report. The Georgian-backed Abkhaz government-in-exile said on 17 June, that Russia refused to allow UN observers in the area.

On 17 June 2008, a Russian Foreign Ministry spokesman warned that Tbilisi's proposal to review the status of the peacekeeping operation in the Georgia-Abkhazia conflict zone could "unfreeze" the conflict, while the situation in the Caucasus as a whole could "slip out of control."

On 17 June 2008, Georgia detained four Russian peacekeepers and a military truck in the conflict zone between Georgia proper and Abkhazia. Georgia's Interior Ministry said that the peacekeepers were transporting 35 crates of ammunition, including guided missiles and anti-tank mines, thus violating the existing agreements. Russia's Defense Ministry said the arrest was "in violation of all regulatory norms in the buffer zone." The peacekeepers were released after nine hours of interrogation. Lieutenant General Alexander Burutin, a deputy head of the General Staff, on 19 June compared the detention to "a bandit attack", saying Russian peacekeepers had every right to use their weapons. Russian President Dmitry Medvedev said Russia would not tolerate such actions against peacekeepers.

A Russian military expert, Pavel Felgenhauer, commenting on the situation in the conflict zone predicted war between Georgia and Abkhazia if provocations didn't stop. Felgenhauer said that Vladimir Putin had already decided to start a war against Georgia in Abkhazia and South Ossetia supposedly in late August 2008. Provocations against Georgia would begin in the Upper Abkhazia and South Ossetia, then the war would spread to the rest of Georgia.

On 23 June 2008, Georgian Deputy Foreign Minister Grigol Vashadze met with Russian Deputy Foreign Minister Grigory Karasin. The sides discussed a broad spectrum of bilateral relations, including the situation in Abkhazia.

On 30 June, Abkhaz separatist government claimed Georgian special services were responsible for the terrorism in Abkhazia. There was one blast in Sukhumi and two were in Gagra. These blasts wounded two in Sukhumi and six in Gagra. Abkhazia threatened to close the border with Georgia in response to the bombing.

May and June events in South Ossetia 

Georgia's foreign minister, Eka Tkeshelashvili, said on 15 May 2008 that Georgia would regard any increase in Russian peacekeepers in South Ossetia as a "gross encroachment on Georgia's sovereignty and territorial integrity". In late May 2008, there were about 1,000 Russian peacekeepers in South Ossetia.

In South Ossetia three explosions occurred near the administrative border. A bomb exploded meters away from a line of Georgian military vehicles. Georgian Deputy Defense Minister Batu Kutelia accused the South Ossetian administration of being responsible, saying they had taken up "tactics of terrorism."

On 20 May 2008, Taymuraz Mamsurov, president of the Russian Republic of North Ossetia, asked foreign ambassadors for their support in uniting the province with South Ossetia. Georgian Ambassador to Russia Erosi Kitsmarishvili said such unification would contravene international law. South Ossetia's President Eduard Kokoity hailed Mamsurov's pronouncement saying "South Ossetia's main goal is unification with North Ossetia in the Russian Federation. We make no secret of this in front of the international community." Kokoity and Dmitry Medoyev suggested an interim period where South Ossetia would be recognized as independent and then formally incorporated into Russia through a referendum.

On the night of 14–15 June 2008, mortar fire and an exchange of fire broke out between South Ossetian and Georgian forces. South Ossetia claimed that mortar fire was launched from Georgian-controlled villages on Tskhinvali, the South Ossetian capital, and that their forces were responding to fire from Georgian forces on the outskirts of the capital. South Ossetian interior minister, Mikhail Mindzaev, said that the exchange of fire lasted for about four hours. Georgia denied firing the first shot, saying instead that South Ossetia had attacked the Georgian-controlled villages of Ergneti, Nikozi and Prisi. One person was killed and four injured in the clashes, and several houses were reportedly damaged. In a separate incident, a 14-year-old boy was injured by a land mine near Ergneti; he later died of his injuries. According to South Ossetia, five people were wounded during the violence and one of them died later.

Russian, Georgian, and North Ossetian peacekeepers as well as Organization for Security and Co-operation in Europe monitors went to the site of the clashes. They came under fire near Ergneti, with no injuries. The fire exchange began on the night of 15 June at 11:38 PM and lasted for half an hour. Automatic firearms and grenade launchers were used.

Aleksandr Dugin, leader of the International Eurasian movement, who was known for his strong ties with the Russian military and intelligence, visited South Ossetia in late June 2008. On 30 June he said at a press conference: "Russia has practically decided to recognize [Abkhazia and South Ossetia], and you have perfectly prepared everything for this. [...] If Russia recognizes independence of South Ossetia and deploys there not peacemaking but Russian border troops, the issue of Georgia joining NATO either will be removed from the agenda for a long time, or this will mean direct conflict with the United States. [...] So, we must recognize Abkhazia and South Ossetia before December."

Russian spy accusation 

On 16 May 2008 it was reported that Russia's Federal Security Service (FSB) claimed to have intercepted a Chechen spy working for Georgia who was trying to help rebels in the North Caucasus. The alleged agent was identified as Ramzan Turkoshvili, a Georgian-born Russian citizen, who the unnamed FSB official said was recruited by Georgian intelligence officers working with Zelimkhan Khangashvili. Khangashvili's group was accused of being involved in a 2004 attack in the Russian Republic of Ingushetia that left nearly 100 people dead, many of them policemen. An unidentified FSB official also claimed Georgian intelligence paid Turkoshvili to establish contacts with militants in the North Caucasus and help Georgia finance them. The detention was cast as proof that confirmed that Georgia's security service was "participating in disruptive terrorist activities in the North Caucasus." The spokesman for Georgian Interior Ministry, Shota Utiashvili denied the accusations and called it "a continuation of Russia's policy of provocation toward Georgia, which has taken a particularly acute form recently."

Russian railway troops in Abkhazia 

On 31 May 2008, Russia sent its railway troops to repair a railway line in Abkhazia. The Russian defence ministry claimed they were unarmed. Georgia condemned the move as an "aggressive" step aimed against the territorial integrity of Georgia. The US Department of State also said that it was "dismayed" by the deployment. Temur Mzhavia, chairman of the exiled Supreme Council of Abkhazia, claimed that Russia planned to recognize Abkhazia on 27 September, when the Abkhaz celebrate an "independence day", but Vyacheslav Kovalenko, Russia's ambassador to Georgia, dismissed such claims as "fabrications".

The new Russian troops' arrival in Abkhazia preceded by a few days a planned meeting between the presidents Mikheil Saakashvili of Georgia and Dmitry Medvedev of Russia on the sidelines of a CIS summit in Saint Petersburg on 6–7 June. It was reported that Saakashvili would hold a phone conversation with Medvedev on 3 June to discuss the deployment of Russian engineering units in Abkhazia. On 3 June, NATO's secretary general Jaap de Hoop Scheffer accused Russia of breaching Georgia's sovereignty by sending in military railway personnel and demanded their withdrawal.

On 7 June 2008, the Russian defense minister Anatoliy Serdyukov said the railroad troops would leave within two months after they would have finished work on the railroad. Moscow claimed to have found an anti-tank mine on 13 June on the section of the Abkhaz railway, which was being repaired by the Russian Railway Forces. Russia claimed this was an attempt at carrying out a "subversive-terrorist act" against the Russian Federation's Railway Forces.

On 18 June 2008, a military official announced the security of the Russian railway troops had been increased, following two blasts on the railway near Sukhumi. Abkhaz police suspected the bombings were targeted at Russian railway forces. Malkhaz Akishbaya, chairman of the Georgian-backed Abkhaz government in exile, claimed the blast was a next provocation aimed at discrediting Georgia. He also said it was directed at legalizing the presence of Russian railway troops.

On 23 June 2008 Sergei Bagapsh said the railways repaired by the Russian railway troops would be used to transport construction material for a sports complex to be used in the 2014 Winter Olympics in Sochi, Russia.

On 24 July 2008 the Russian Defense Ministry said Russian railroad troops had almost finished repair work on the railway in Abkhazia and would withdraw in early August. A spokesman for the Defense Ministry said there would be a ceremony for resuming the operation of the fixed section at the end of July, and the troops would return to their bases in Russia after taking part in the ceremony. Russian railroad troops began pulling out of Abkhazia on 30 July 2008. After the war broke out, a part of the 9,000 Russian troops who went into Georgia from Abkhazia travelled with their hardware via the repaired railway.

New peace efforts 
On 5 March 2008, Georgia withdrew from Joint Control Commission for Georgian–Ossetian Conflict Resolution. Georgia proposed a format which also envisaged active roles for the EU, OSCE and the Sanakoyev administration. Russian special envoy Yuri Popov said that it was too early to include Sanakoyev in the JCC negotiations.

On 28 March 2008, the President of Georgia, Mikheil Saakashvili, speaking at an international conference "The Role of Non-Governmental Organisations in the Processes of Reintegration in Georgia" organised by the Office of the Georgian State Minister for Reintegration, unveiled a series of new proposals designed to resolve the Abkhaz conflict. These initiatives included a joint free economic zone, Abkhaz representation in the central government with an Abkhaz vice-president, the right to veto all Abkhaz-related decisions, unlimited autonomy and various security guarantees. However, when United Nations Observer Mission in Georgia delivered the proposals to Abkhaz separatists, they refused.

On 15 May 2008, the United Nations General Assembly adopted a resolution in which it recognized the right of return of all refugees and internally displaced persons (IDPs) to Abkhazia. The resolution stressed the importance of retaining the property rights of the refugees and IDPs and underlined the need for a timetable to ensure the voluntary return of all refugees and IDPs. Russia voted against the Georgian-sponsored resolution. The Russian Foreign Ministry said that Georgia's submission of the draft was "a counterproductive step".

On 7 June 2008, fifteen EU ambassadors headed by EU High Representative for the Common Foreign and Security Javier Solana completed a two-day visit to Abkhazia. After meeting with Solana, Abkhaz president Sergei Bagapsh said: "There is no alternative to the Russian peacekeepers in the region. Their replacement with any other troops will not be discussed with anyone... If Georgia wants them out of its territory, we will do everything for them to remain in Abkhazia." Solana said that the conflict could not be resolved without Russia and Russia was a key player in the peace process. Giorgi Baramidze, the Georgian deputy prime minister and minister on European and Euro-Atlantic integration said: "Georgia is ready to sign a ceasefire agreement with Abkhazia if it is guaranteed by the European Union." Baramidze said that earlier agreements without an effective guarantor had resulted in the loss of Gagra, Sukhumi and the main part of Abkhazia for Georgia. He added, "We are ready for constructive dialogue both with the Russians and the separatists. We want to carry out our peace plan, which primarily entails the introduction of neutral and genuinely peace-oriented European and international peacekeepers, and decent, safe and unconditional return of refugees."

On 28 June 2008, the Parliamentary Assembly of the OSCE supported the preservation of Georgia's territorial integrity. "We want to find a compromise and a peaceful resolution of this issue," OSCE PA President Göran Lennmarker said.

On 8 July 2008, the United States Department of State called on the central Georgian government and the Abkhaz de facto authorities to resume direct talks. The Department of State also called for International Police Force presence in Georgian-Abkhazian conflict zone. The State Department spokesman also spoke about visit of Condoleezza Rice to Georgia, who would encourage a peaceful resolution of the Abkhaz and South Ossetian conflicts. However, Abkhaz leader Sergei Bagapsh ruled out the possibility of replacing the Russian peacekeepers with an international police force.

On 14 July 2008, the Abkhaz leader Sergei Bagapsh met with Hans-Dieter Lukas. On the same day EU Special Representative for the South Caucasus Peter Semneby met with Abkhaz leader Sergei Bagapsh in Sukhumi. Bagapsh said that he studied a draft plan on the settlement of the Georgian-Abkhaz conflict that was worked out by the U.N. Secretary-General's Group of Friends. However he added, "We can’t discuss it in the form that it has been presented today." Bagapsh stressed that the main condition for resuming the dialogue with Georgia was "the withdrawal of all armed units from the Kodori gorge and the signing of an agreement on non-use of force". Peter Semneby also met with Prime minister Alexander Ankvab and foreign minister Sergei Shamba. Sergei Shamba said that the plan needed "more preparation."

On 14 July, the U.S. Department of State said in a statement it was "deeply troubled" by Russia's acknowledgement that Russian military aircraft flew over South Ossetia. "Such actions raise questions about Russia's role as peacekeeper and facilitator of the negotiations and threaten stability throughout the entire region," said the statement. That day, the OSCE Permanent Council held a special meeting underscoring the urgency of the resumption of dialogue between Georgian and South Ossetian authorities to de-escalate tensions.

On 16 July 2008, Georgian National Security Council Secretary Aleksandre Lomaia said that the new plan had "positive elements," but still required "polishing." Lomaia also said that the repatriation process of IDPs could not start until the Russian peacekeeping force was withdrawn. David Bakradze, Georgian parliament's speaker, said that if a German plan for resolving the conflict did not get wide support, Georgia would be forced to "unilaterally bring an influence to bear on the deployment of armed forces in Abkhazia."

On 17 July 2008, German Foreign Minister Steinmeier met with his Georgian counterpart Eka Tkeshelashvili in Tbilisi. Russian Foreign Minister Sergey Lavrov said that the return of refugees to Abkhazia was "entirely unrealistic at this stage." He said "the situation first needs to be improved and trust restored." On the evening of the same day, Steinmeier met with Georgian president Mikheil Saakashvili in Batumi. Saakashvili said at a briefing that Tbilisi had no intention of using force to retake Abkhazia. Steinmeier said that Germany supported the territorial integrity of Georgia and considered Abkhazia to be Georgia's inalienable part. On 18 July, Steinmeier met with Abkhaz leader Sergei Bagapsh in Gali. After his meeting with Steinmeier, Bagapsh said that Abkhazia still would not discuss German peace proposal. Bagapsh also said he planned to submit his own counterproposal.

On 23 July 2008, Daniel Fried, Assistant Secretary of State for European and Eurasian Affairs, said that it was time to stop violence in the conflict zones and to continue negotiations. He said that refugees must return to Abkhazia. He approved the German plan.

On 25 July 2008, the South Ossetian separatists rejected proposal by the OSCE chairman-in-office Alexander Stubb to hold Georgia-South Ossetia meeting in Helsinki. The separatists had previously refused to participate in talks in Brussels arranged by EU on 22 July.

However, Abkhaz officials rejected the talks. Russian ambassador to UN Vitaly Churkin said that Russia was against immediately summoning a meeting of the UN Secretary General's Group of Friends on Georgia to discuss the Abkhaz conflict.

On 31 July 2008, Abkhaz president Sergei Bagapsh said the talks in Berlin would be between Georgia and the Group of UN Secretary General's Friends on Georgia (the U.K., Germany, Russia, U.S. and France) and between Abkhazia and the Group. Bagapsh also said, "The meeting was initially planned for July 28–29. However, this didn't suit us. We have settled on August 15–20 for the meeting."

On 3 August, president Sergei Bagapsh declared that the Abkhaz representatives would not meet with the U.N. Secretary-General's Group of Friends. Bagapsh cited the events in the Georgian-South Ossetian conflict zone as reason for this, claiming Georgia was pursuing "a policy of genocide". That day, a phone conversation was held between Georgian Deputy Minister of Foreign Affairs Vashadze and Russian Deputy Minister of Foreign Affairs Karasin. The Georgian side stressed that the complicated situation in the South Ossetian conflict zone was caused by ineffective format of negotiations and peacekeeping operation. Vashadze said that the Georgian side was ready for direct negotiations.

July 2008 events 
The overall situation in South Ossetia seriously deteriorated in early July 2008. South Ossetia called up military reservists and put its security forces on alert in response to the clashes. The head of Russia's peacekeeping troops in the region was quoted as saying extra soldiers could be deployed if the stand-off worsened.

On 6 July 2008 a bomb in Gali, Abkhazia killed four people and injured six. Abkhaz authorities claimed that the chain of bombings was done by Georgian spies. Abkhazia called on G8 countries, the UN and the OSCE to stop a "terror threat from Georgia." Abkhazia also cut off all contact with Georgia in response to the bombing. Georgia condemned the bombings and blamed them on Russia, claiming the attacks were being done in the interest of a prolonged presence of Russian armed forces in Georgia.

Georgian President Mikheil Saakashvili told police to prepare an operation to free the four soldiers.

Russian military jets flew over South Ossetia on 8 July 2008. On 10 July, the Russian authorities confirmed the flight and said, in an official statement, the fighters were sent to "let hot heads in Tbilisi cool down." This was Russia's first admission in a decade that its air force had flown over Georgian territory without permission. Moscow had always denied earlier overflights. The Russian overflight was ordered less than 24 hours before the U.S. Secretary of State, Condoleezza Rice, was due to arrive in Georgia. In response, Georgia recalled its ambassador to Moscow "for consultations", stating that it was "outraged by Russia's aggressive policies."

Rice arrived in Georgia on 9 July. On 11 July 2008 Deputy Foreign Minister Grigol Vashadze called for an urgent UN Security Council meeting on the conflict zones. The U.N. Security Council discussed the overflights at a closed meeting on 21 July, however no decision was reached. Russian envoy Vitaliy Churkin denounced the "pro-Georgian bias" of some Security Council members.

A South Ossetian envoy on 11 July 2008 declared that South Ossetia was capable of repelling any attack by Georgia without help from Russia and also said the mainly Russian peacekeeping contingent in the Georgian-South Ossetian conflict zone should be increased. Nika Rurua, Deputy Head of the Parliament's Security and Defense Committee, warned Georgia would shoot down Russia's military aircraft should they appear in its airspace again. The initiative was considered to this effect. But Georgian lawmakers decided instead to appeal to the world community on the matter. Media reports published information about Russia's alleged plans to seize the Kodori Gorge specifying that the details of the operation were worked out by Russian high-ranking military officials, with Abkhazia's President Sergei Bagapsh. In response to Georgia's summoning of a special UNSC session, the sources of Kommersant with the Russian Foreign Office claimed that Russia would reveal the details of a planned military invasion of South Ossetia by Georgia to release the detained Georgian officers.

On 14 July 2008 Georgia's deputy defense minister Batu Kutelia said Georgia planned to expand its military more than 15 percent to 37,000 soldiers to counter Russian aggression. The additional manpower would be used to defend Georgia's airspace and the Black Sea coast.

Also on 15 July, Abkhazia and South Ossetia were said to be planning to join the Union of Russia and Belarus. A spokesman for the Union said both regions had talked about joining the Union, but that they would need to be recognized as independent and become observers before they could join the Union as members.

According to media reports, on 19 July 2008 a Georgian police post was attacked by Abkhaz militias using grenades; one Abkhaz militiaman died from a grenade exploding accidentally. Abkhaz officials denied attack on the Georgian police post. Georgian media also reported on 19 July that a battalion of Russian troops had moved into the lower Kodori Gorge. Georgia's Defense Ministry claimed Russian troops encroached on strategic passes of the Main Caucasus Ridge and were in the combat alert. Commenting on alleged Russian deployment to the Kodori Gorge, Abkhazia's Foreign Minister said no new troops were brought in to Abkhazia over the quota.

On 20 July 2008, South Ossetian official media concluded its news report by saying that "But the fact that events in the Georgian-Ossetian conflict zone continue to be one of the most interesting topics for discussion even at the international level, is a good sign that allows us to hope for a positive solution of the issue of freedom and independence of the Republic of South Ossetia in the near future."

A U.N. report issued on 23 July 2008 covering the period between April and July 2008 noted discrepancies with the Georgian account of a shooting in Khurcha on the day of Georgian elections. In particular the report noted the way the incident was filmed suggested the attack was anticipated. The report said reconnaissance flights by Georgia were a violation of the ceasefire, but said the shooting down of those fights also constituted a breach of the ceasefire. Concerning a military buildup by Georgia the UN report said it found no evidence of a buildup but noted observers were denied access to certain areas of Abkhazia controlled by Georgia, including the Kvabchara Valley.

On 25 July 2008, one person was killed from a bomb blast in Tskhinvali.

On 28 July 2008, the Russian command of the Joint Peacekeeping Forces said South Ossetian forces had blocked peacekeepers and OSCE observers from the village of Cholibauri which was close to where Georgia said South Ossetia was building fortifications. South Ossetian armed militias fired at the peacekeepers and OSCE observers. Georgian media reported that Georgian posts on the Sarabuki heights were attacked by South Ossetian forces overnight and early on 29 July, with no injuries reported. The Georgian village of Sveri was shelled with small arms and rocket-propelled grenades by the South Ossetians on the morning of 29 July. The peacekeepers and OSCE observers visited the area to investigate an exchange of fire, however they were fired upon at 10 AM. On the late evening of the same day, South Ossetia said two South Ossetian villages had been fired on by Georgian forces in response to South Ossetia reinforcing its positions on the perimeter of the conflict zone. According to the South Ossetian Press and Information Committee, one person was injured.

At the end of July South Ossetia confirmed it had been setting up military fortifications in the conflict zone and acknowledged this violated previous agreements, but claimed it was in response to similar actions by the Georgian side. According to Colonel Wolfgang Richter, a military adviser to the German Organization for Security and Co-operation in Europe (OSCE) mission, Georgia concentrated troops along the South Ossetian border in July.

Military exercises
According to anonymous European diplomat, Russia's defense chief talked to a group of his NATO counterparts in April 2008 and warned them of an invasion of Georgia later in 2008.

In early July 2008, OSInform Information Agency published several articles where the participation of the Russian army in the future "peace enforcement" operation in Georgia was discussed. One of the articles said that the planned Russian exercises were not accidental and this suggested a military operation on the foreign soil.

On 5 July 2008, the Russians began military exercises, dubbed Caucasus Frontier 2008, in the North Caucasus.

On 15 July 2008 the U.S. and Russia both began exercises in the Caucasus though Russia denied the timing was intentional. The Russian exercises, dubbed Caucasus 2008 involved units of the North Caucasus Military District, mainly the 58th Army, the 4th Air Force Army, Interior Ministry troops, and border guards. The exercises included training to support peacekeepers in Abkhazia and South Ossetia. A Russian army spokesman Igor Konashenkov said that around 700 pieces of military hardware would be used during the exercises. Georgia said the exercises were a manifestation of Russian aggression against it. The Georgian Foreign Ministry said in a statement: "Not a single document on conflict resolution authorises Russian armed forces to carry out any kind of activity on the territory of Georgia." During exercises a leaflet entitled "Soldier! Know your probable enemy!" (that described the Georgian Armed Forces) was circulated among the Russian participants. The Russian exercises ended on 2 August. Russian troops remained near the Georgian border after the end of their exercise, instead of returning to their bases.

The US exercises were called "Immediate Response 2008" and included forces from the United States, Georgia, Ukraine, Azerbaijan, and Armenia. 127 U.S. trainers participated in the exercises. The Georgian 4th Brigade (which later participated in the war) took part in the Georgian exercise with 1,000 American troops, and Russia accused the United States of aiding Georgian attack preparations. Joint exercises focused on counterinsurgency operations and a Georgian brigade was prepared for duty in Iraq. The joint exercises of the US and Georgian Armed Forces ended on 31 July.

On 6 August the Georgian Defense Ministry announced a two-week exercise, "Georgian Express 2008", would take place with 180 British military personnel, starting in September.

War

In the first week of August 2008, a number of confrontations took place in South Ossetia after Ossetian separatists attacked Georgian positions.

The crisis gave rise on 7 August 2008, when South Ossetian separatists began shelling Georgian villages several hours after President Saakashvili had called for a cease-fire and resumption of peace talks. Georgia launched a large-scale military operation against South Ossetia.

Post-war events in 2008
On 26 August 2008, Russia officially recognized both South Ossetia and Abkhazia as independent states. In response to Russia's recognition of Abkhazia and South Ossetia, the Georgian government announced that the country had cut all diplomatic relations with Russia.

On 28 August 2008, South Ossetian representative Mikhail Mindzaev claimed that Georgian pilotless aerial vehicle was shot down during the night.

In the beginning of September 2008, the White House announced a $1 billion program of economic aid for Georgia, with about half going to Georgia before President Bush would leave office.

On 10 September 2008, a Georgian policeman was killed allegedly by Russian soldiers in a village north of Gori. The shooting happened several hundred meters from a Russian checkpoint in Karaleti, twelve miles from South Ossetia. Russian officials denied responsibility, saying that it may have been perpetrated by South Ossetians.

On 13 September 2008, a Georgian policeman was killed in Ganmukhuri on the administrative border between Abkhazia and Georgia.

On 21 September 2008, a Georgian policeman was killed and three wounded on the administrative border between Abkhazia and Georgia. Georgian authorities stated the incident occurred at the time when shots were fired "from the direction of the [nearby] Russian army checkpoint", with the following exchange of fire between Georgian police and Abkhaz-controlled territory lasting for several minutes.

On 22 September 2008, two Georgian policemen were wounded by a mine on the administrative border between Abkhazia and Georgia.

On 24 September 2008, Georgian police detained a Russian military truck near the village of Odzisi in the Mtskheta Municipality. The truck contained ammunitions and explosives. The Russian driver said he had lost his way. He was handed over to OSCE observers.

On 25 September 2008, a 13-year-old South Ossetian resident was killed when an explosive device blew up on the outskirts of Tskhinvali.

On 3 October 2008, seven Russian soldiers were killed and another seven wounded by a car bomb that exploded near the Russian military base. Among them was Colonel Ivan Petrik, the peacekeeper's Chief of Staff. The Russians accused the Georgians of orchestrating the "terrorist attack", claiming that just before the blast. "We have no doubt that these terrorist acts are the work of Georgia special forces." The French Presidency of the European Union condemned the attack.

On 6 October 2008, an Abkhaz border guard was shot and killed near the administrative border between Abkhazia and Georgia.

On 18 October 2008, Georgian media reported that a bridge in the Adzva village in the Gori district was partially blown up by allegedly Ossetians.

On 21 October 2008, the police car was blown up by a mine near the village of Avnevi and one policeman was injured.

In mid-October 2008, South Ossetian police were given orders to return fire should they be on the receiving end of a firing from the Georgian side. This was seen as directive that could increase the threat of new violence. South Ossetia's top police official issued this order in response to a police post coming under automatic weapons fire from an ethnic Georgian village. The acting Interior Minister Mikhail Mindzayev said nobody was hurt by the gunfire, although he did refer to it as a series of provocations by Georgians forces.

On 25 October 2008, a bomb exploded in the Georgian town of Mujava near the administrative border with Abkhazia killing a villager and the governor of the Tsalenjikha district of Georgia, Giorgi Mebonia.

On 9 November 2008, in the morning two Georgian policemen were killed and three injured after the police car was exploded by a mine on the road near the village of Dvani.

Relations in 2009

On 19 January 2009, Russian President Dmitry Medvedev signed a law making it illegal to sell, supply, or transfer military production to Georgia, and prohibiting the use of Russian railways, waters, and airspace for military co-operation with Georgia. According to RIA Novosti, countries or individuals found to be in breach of these regulations would face economic and financial sanctions. The sanctions were to last until December 2011.

On 19 and 21 January, Russia requested that Georgia allow its experts access to Georgian military installations for evaluation and verification checks in accordance with a 1999 Vienna OSCE document on confidence and security-building measures. Georgia rejected these requests.

On 23 January 2009, Russia expressed concern over "Georgia's expanding military presence on the borders of Abkhazia and South Ossetia." Russian Foreign Minister Sergey Lavrov had said, "EU monitors working in areas adjacent to South Ossetia and Abkhazia have been reporting a buildup of Georgian military units and special forces near the borders with South Ossetia and Abkhazia, and our 'technical devices' have also recorded this. Provocations also occur sporadically. We are concerned by this."

On 26 January 2009, Russian junior sergeant Alexander Glukhov appeared in Tbilisi. He gave press interviews at McDonald's in the presence of Georgian Interior Ministry officials. The 21-year-old claimed that bad living conditions and problems with his superior forced him to desert: "I had very bad relations with my commander. He didn't like anything I did and that was why I left." According to Georgian interior ministry sources, he appealed for permission to remain in Georgia.

On 2 February 2009, at a meeting with EU envoys, Russian Deputy Foreign Minister Alexander Grushko expressed concern over the build-up of Georgian troops on the border with South Ossetia. "Grushko expressed concern in connection with the build-up of a Georgian military presence on South Ossetia's borders," the Foreign Ministry declared in a statement. "The increased activity of their [Georgian] special units has been reported on the eastern part of the South Ossetian border."

On 6 February 2009, Georgia submitted the application against Russia to the European Court of Human Rights, to continue the process that started on 11 August 2008.

In February 2009, Pavel Felgenhauer, a military analyst, claimed that Russia planned to invade Georgia from South Ossetia in order to topple the Saakashvili government.

On 22 April 2009, shooting took place on the administrative border between Georgia and South Ossetia. Both sides reported automatic weapons fire, and blamed each other for the incident.

By 1 August 2009, at least 28 Georgian policemen patrolling the South Ossetian administrative boundary had been killed by sniper fire or mines during the first year after the end of the war.

On 1 August 2009, Russian Defense Ministry said that Georgia had previously opened fire on the South Ossetian territory several times in the past few days.

On 3 August 2009, South Ossetian separatists threw grenades into Georgian and Russian checkpoints. The next day, South Ossetia accused Georgia of opening fire on 3 August.

On 3 August 2009, RIA Novosti published an interview with South Ossetian president Eduard Kokoity. Kokoity said that he ruled out a new "Georgian aggression". He said he would demand ceding of the Truso Gorge (part of the Georgian administrative unit of Mtskheta-Mtianeti) to South Ossetia. He also talked about Georgian president Saakashvili: "As for that lover of wars and bellicose slogans, that international criminal, I would advise him to be careful. Considering his behavior, Georgia has a shortage of mental hospitals."

On 4 August 2009, it was reported that tensions were rising before the war's first anniversary. The European Union urged "all sides to refrain from any statement or action that may lead to increased tensions at this particularly sensitive time." Georgia's Foreign Ministry condemned Russia's "deliberate attempts" to escalate the situation. Mikheil Saakashvili urged the US and EU to defuse the tensions.

On 5 August 2009, Russia claimed that the United States continued to deliver large amounts of weapons to Georgia.

Yulia Latynina wrote in The Moscow Times that events in South Ossetia were unfolding according to last year's scenario. As soon as the U.S. Vice President Joe Biden had announced that the United States would not provide arms to Georgia, the South Ossetian president Eduard Kokoity claimed that Tskhinvali had come under fire from the Georgian village of Nikozi. Latynina argued: "Considering the fact that South Ossetian forces had already wiped Nikozi off the map, his statement sounded a bit strange." It would be impossible to repeat last year's scenario again, because in 2008 the world didn't pay attention to the fact that before the war started, South Ossetian forces were shelling Georgian territory while declaring their readiness to launch a "counterstrike" against Georgian cities. Latynina concluded that if the conflict was renewed, nobody would believe that Kokoity had started the war; everyone would conclude that it had been Putin.

Close to the one year anniversary of the start of the war, internet attacks occurred that targeted one Georgian user. The Twitter account of a Georgian blogger, Cyxymu came under attack, leading to a several-hour-long downtime of the entire service.

On 14 August 2009, Shota Utiashvili, Georgia's Interior Ministry representative said that the South Ossetian side had confessed to shelling of the Georgian villages.

See also 
 Georgian–Ossetian conflict
 Georgia–Russia relations
 Controversy over Abkhaz and South Ossetian independence
 Kosovo independence precedent
 Frozen conflict
 Georgia–European Union relations
 Russo-Georgian War

References 

Georgia (country)–Russia relations
2008
2008 in Russia
2008 in Georgia (country)
2008 in Abkhazia
2008 in South Ossetia
2008 in international relations